Amaraagiin Dölgöön (born 19 February 2001) is a Mongolian footballer who plays as a defender for Mongolian Premier League club Deren and the Mongolian national team. He made his first appearance for the Mongolia national football team in 2019.

Career

International goals
Scores and results list Mongolia's goal tally first.

References

External links
National Football Teams profile

2001 births
Living people
Mongolian footballers
Mongolia international footballers
Association football defenders
Deren FC players